Junactva Stadium is a multi-purpose stadium in Mazyr, Belarus. It is currently used mostly for football matches and is the home ground of FC Slavija Mazyr. The stadium was opened in 1992 and currently holds 5,133 people.

References

External links
FC Slavija Mazyr official website
Stadium profile at pressball.by

Football venues in Belarus
FC Slavia Mozyr
Mazyr